This is a comprehensive listing of official releases by American singer-songwriter Melissa Etheridge. She has released 16 studio albums, 43 singles and 38 music videos on Island Records, Universal Music Group, ME Records, and BMG. Over the course of her career, she has amassed five Platinum albums, three of which are multi-platinum, and two Gold albums. She also has 11 Billboard Hot 100 charting singles, with six of them hitting the Top 40, and 11 Billboard Adult Contemporary charting singles, all peaking in the Top 40. According to the Recording Industry Association of America, she has sold 13 million certified albums in the United States.

Etheridge was signed to Island Records by Chris Blackwell and released her debut album, Melissa Etheridge, in 1988. Her second album, Brave and Crazy, appeared the following year. Etheridge released her third album, Never Enough, in 1992. The following year, she released what would become her mainstream breakthrough album: Yes I Am. Its tracks "I'm the Only One", "Come to My Window", and "If I Wanted To" all reached the Top 40 in the United States, while the album spent 138 weeks on the Billboard 200, peaking at No. 15, and earned a RIAA certification of 6× Platinum, her largest selling album to date. Her fifth album, Your Little Secret, was released in 1995 and peaked at No. 6 on the Billboard 200, her highest charting album to date. The album went 2× Platinum, and its tracks "I Want to Come Over" and "Nowhere to Go" both reached the Top 40. Her sixth album, Breakdown, was released in 1999 and reached No. 12 on the Billboard 200. The album went Gold, and its lead single, "Angels Would Fall", reached No. 51 in the United States.

Her seventh and eighth studio albums, Skin and Lucky, appeared in 2001 and 2004, respectively. Her first compilation album, Greatest Hits: The Road Less Traveled, was released in 2005 and became a great commercial success, going Gold, while it reached No. 14 on the Billboard 200. The Awakening was released in 2007, and her first Christmas album, A New Thought for Christmas, appeared the following year. Her last albums for Island Records, Fearless Love and 4th Street Feeling, appeared in 2010 and 2012, respectively. Etheridge formed her own record label, ME Records, and released her 13th album, This Is M.E., in 2014. MEmphis Rock and Soul appeared in 2016, followed by The Medicine Show in 2019. Her most recent studio album is One Way Out.

Albums

Studio albums

Compilation albums

Live albums

Extended plays
Melissa Etheridge Live (1988)
5 Live Cuts (1988)
Live (1990)

Singles

 Notes
  "Like the Way I Do" did not chart on the U.S. Billboard Hot 100 on its initial release. Seven years later it was re-released as the B-side to "If I Wanted To", allowing the track to chart on the Hot 100 for the first time.

Soundtrack contributions

Miscellaneous
These songs have not appeared on a studio album released by Etheridge.

DVDs

Music videos

Notes

References
General
Live... and Alone, 2001, complete discography
melissaetheridge.com

Specific

External links
www.melissaetheridge.com

Discography
Rock music discographies